George Pease, 4th Baron Gainford (20 April 1926 – 12 March 2022) was a British architect and town planner and a member of the Pease family of Darlington, County Durham, England. He succeeded his brother as 4th Baron Gainford in 2013, but did not use the title.

Pease was educated at Eton College and served in World War II in the Royal Navy Volunteer Reserve. He was an architect at the Royal Institute of British Architects and at the Royal Incorporation of Architects in Scotland and a town planner at the Royal Town Planning Institute; County Planning Officer for Ross and Cromarty 1967–1975 and a Scottish Office Inquiry Reporter 1978–1993.

He died at Moncreiffe Care Home in Perth, on 12 March 2022, at the age of 95.

References

1926 births
2022 deaths
People educated at Eton College
George
Barons in the Peerage of the United Kingdom
Royal Naval Volunteer Reserve personnel of World War II
British architects
British urban planners